Kalanchoe gastonis-bonnieri is a species of flowering plant in the family Crassulaceae. They are called "palm beachbells" or "donkey ear plants" as they have leaves resembling the shape of a donkey's ear.

K. gastonis-bonnieri have thick green leaves more or less with brownish spots and often form plantlets at leaf tips. It may be confused with K. suarezensis and K. mortagei, whose leaves have no spots.

References

gastonis-bonnieri
gastonis-bonnieri
House plants
Taxa named by Joseph Marie Henry Alfred Perrier de la Bâthie